Ivankovo is a rural locality (a village) in Slednevskoye Rural Settlement, Alexandrovsky District, Vladimir Oblast, Russia. The population was 94 as of 2010. There are 6 streets.

Geography 
Ivankovo is located 22 km west of Alexandrov (the district's administrative centre) by road. Arsaki is the nearest rural locality.

References 

Rural localities in Alexandrovsky District, Vladimir Oblast